Toca is a genus of South American wandering spiders first described by D. Polotow & Antônio Brescovit in 2009.  it contains only two species, both found in Brazil: T. bossanova and T. samba.

References

External links

Araneomorphae genera
Ctenidae
Taxa named by Antônio Brescovit